Ben 10: Omniverse is an American animated television series and the fourth installment of the Ben 10 franchise (and the final series in the original continuity), which aired on Cartoon Network from September 22, 2012, to November 14, 2014, in the United States. Man of Action Studios, consisting of Duncan Rouleau, Joe Casey, Joe Kelly, and Steven T. Seagle, created the franchise.

The series was announced at Cartoon Network's Upfront in 2011. Concept art, described as a homage to the original Ben 10 series, designed by Derrick J. Wyatt (Transformers: Animated and Scooby-Doo! Mystery Incorporated) was first unveiled at the 2012 UK Toy Fair.

The series premiered on September 22, 2012, with a "sneak peek episode" that aired on August 1, 2012. A "sneak peek" of the series aired after "Ben 10 Week" (March 19, 2012March 24, 2012).

The show was followed by a reboot of the series in 2016.

Plot
The series follows the adventures of sixteen-year-old Ben Tennyson, wielder of the Omnitrix, an extremely powerful watch-style device that allows Ben to change into a multitude of various aliens; each with their own special abilities and skills. The storylines alternate between that of eleven-year-old Ben (one year after the original series) and sixteen-year-old Ben (a few months after Ben 10: Ultimate Alien). After Gwen leaves for college and Kevin leaves to be closer to her, Ben gets a new partner, a rookie by-the-book alien plumber named Rook Blonko (surname first). On a mission to explore a secret underground alien city named Undertown, Ben explores the quirkier side of things in the alien underground and discovers that enemies from his past are looking for a rematch.

In "T.G.I.S.", it is revealed that the Ben 10 universe shares the same universe with The Secret Saturdays.

Episodes

Voice cast

Principal voice actors
 Yuri Lowenthal – Ben Tennyson (16-years-old), Feedback, XLR8, Albedo (Human form), AmpFibian, Kickin Hawk, The Worst, Walkatrout, Molestache, Pesky Dust (1st Time), Hervé, Upgrade, Lt. Steel, Sumo Slammer, N-8, Alien Kid
 Bumper Robinson – Rook Blonko, Bloxx, Terraspin, Jury Rigg, Corvo, Ball Weevil, Doc Saturday, Punchinello, Crujo, Alan Albright, Parallelogram Vreedle
 Paul Eiding – Max Tennyson, Liam, Eye Guy, Blukic, Zed, Hoodlum, Ultimate Spidermonkey
 Dee Bradley Baker – Lodestar, Spidermonkey, Water Hazard, NRG, Clockwork, Nanomech, Swampfire, Big Chill, Crashhopper, Astrodactyl, Psyphon, Echo Echo, Wildvine, Caitliff, Hulex Colonel, Thirteen, Ultimate Echo Echo, the Worst, Wildmutt, Stinkfly, Acid Breath, Kraab, Slix Vigma
 Eric Bauza – Diamondhead, Eatle, Grey Matter, Upchuck, Chromastone, Driba, Dr. Psychobos, Fistrick, Megawhatt, Articguana, Way Big, Albedo (Galvan form), Bellicus (of Alien X), Pax, Solid Plugg, Ripjaws, Lackno, Mechaneer, Trombipulor, Computrons, Rook Da, Thunderpig, Commander Raff, Cast Iron, Poltroon, Ultimate Albedo, Buzzshock, Ultimate Articguana, Plumber Jerry, Cooper Daniels
 Corey Burton – Malware, Mr. Baumann, Brainstorm, Seebik, Fiskerton, V.V. Argost, Albedo Brainstorm, Kane North/Kangaroo Kommando
 John DiMaggio – Armodrillo, Zombozo, Bubble Helmet, Four Arms, Rath, Humungousaur, Octagon Vreedle, Vulkanus, Bullfrag, Will Harangue, Ultimate Humungousaur, Tentacle Vendor, Atomix, Whampire, Judge Domstol, Centur Squarr
 David Kaye – Khyber, Cannonbolt, Shocksquatch, Gravattack, Heatblast, Sunder, Frankenstrike, Mallice, Warlord Gar, Ultimate Gravattack, Thumbskull, Forever King Joseph Chadwick (2nd Time), Lord Transyl, Deefus Veeblepister, Unitaur, Slapstrike, Exo-Skull, Skurd
 Rob Paulsen – Magister Patelliday, Rhomboid Vreedle, Ditto, Captain Kork, Tummy Head, Gorvan, Phil, Gutrot
 Kevin Michael Richardson – Snare-oh, Blitzwolfer, Emperor Milleous, Cookmeister, Sir Morton, Plumber Dispatcher
 Tara Strong – Ben Tennyson (5, 10, and 11-years-old), Pakmar, Mazuma, Natalie Alvarez, Ben Tennyson of Dimension 23, Y-It, Molly Gunther, Brown Bag, Princess Attea, Lucy Mann, Pesky Dust (2nd Time), Albedo (11-year-old Ben form), ML-E (1st Time), ML-E's Mother, Duffy, Swift, Diamondhead Gwen

Additional voices
 Charlie Adler – Professor Blarney T. Hokestar, Cow Alien, Chicken Alien, Collectimus, Proctor Servantis
 Carlos Alazraqui – Rad Dudesman, Scout, Pyxi
 Aziz Ansari – Billy Billions
 René Auberjonois – Azmuth, Azmuth of Dimension 23, Intellectuary
 Diedrich Bader – Simian
 Ogie Banks – Zak Saturday
 Jeff Bennett – Kundo
 Steven Jay Blum – Vilgax, Hobble, Zs'Skayr, Ghostfreak, Professor Helena Xagliv, Bill Gacks, Adwaita, Pa Vreedle, Thaddeus J. Collins
 Kimberly Brooks – Princess Looma, Serena (of Alien X), Madison, Rayona, Rook Bralla
 Bettina Bush – Kai Green
 Greg Cipes – Kevin Levin (12, 17 and 43 years old)
 Jeffrey Combs – Kuphulu
 Jim Cummings – Vexx, Hulex Colonel
 Tim Curry – Forever King Joseph Chadwick (1st Time)
 Diane Delano – Ma Vreedle
 Michael Dorn – Dr. Viktor
 Dave Fennoy – Tetrax Shard of Dimension 23  
 Michael Goldstrom – Benevelon
 Jennifer Hale – Rojo, Suemongousaur
 Mark Hamill – Maltruant
 Jon Heder – Clyde Fife
 Ashley Johnson – Gwen Tennyson (11, 16 and 42 years old), Margie, Wildvine Gwen, Cannonbolt Gwen, XLR8 Gwen
 Tom Kenny – Bezel
 Phil LaMarr – Jonesy
 Juliet Landau – Helen Wheels, Magistrata
 Beth Littleford – Sandra Tennyson, Isosceles Right Triangle Vreedle
 Morgan Lofting – Fistina, Yetta
 Vanessa Marshall – Drew Saturday
 David McCallum – Paradox
 Edie McClurg – Vera Tennyson
 Christopher McDonald – Carl Nesmith/Captain Nemesis
 Scott Menville – Jimmy Jones, Chrono Spanner/Kenny Tennyson
 Kate Micucci – Luhley
 Miguel Nájera – Wes Green
 Judd Nelson – Ben 10,000, Eon
 Khary Payton – Manny Armstrong, Hex
 Vyvan Pham – Julie Yamamoto, Ship
 Charles Phoenix – Charles Zenith
 Tara Platt – Ester, ML-E (2nd Time), J-NE, Subdora, Jennifer Nocturne
 Alexander Polinsky – Argit
 Kevin Schon – OTTO
 Dwight Schultz – Dr. Animo
 Cree Summer – Frightwig
 Tia Texada – Elena Validus
 Alanna Ubach – Rook Shar, Rook Ben
 Kari Wahlgren – Charmcaster, Viktoria 
 Wil Wheaton – Darkstar, Dante
 April Winchell – Queen Voratia Rumbletum
 Gwendoline Yeo – Nyancy Chan, Sheelane

Crew
 Susan Blu – Casting and Voice Director
 Sebastian Evans II – Composer
 Charlotte Fullerton – Story Editor
 Carlos Sanches – Re-Recording Mixer
 Matt Wayne – Story Editor
 Derrick J. Wyatt – Art Director and Lead Character Designer
 Matt Youngberg – Supervising Producer

Merchandise and other media

Toy line
A toy line manufactured by Bandai was originally shown off at Toy Fairs around the world. A possible unintentional leak of official images of the line was released on the website of department store Kmart. Figures that were revealed at Toy Fairs such as Bloxx, Shocksquatch,
16-year-old Ben Tennyson,
an 11-year-old version of Ben,
and Ben's sidekick Rook
were listed on the website. The vehicle play set, "Rook's Truck", has won an award for Best Action Figures/Accessories at the 2012 London Toy Fair. The Omnitrix Touch has a gray color instead of the white it features in the show.

Video games
A video game of the same name is developed by Vicious Cycle Studios for the Wii U, Wii, PlayStation 3, Xbox 360 and by 1st Playable Productions for the Nintendo 3DS and Nintendo DS. The action beat 'em up features 15 playable characters on DS and 3DS and 16 playable characters on the other systems. It also features a two-player co-op play. The game follows Ben and Rook in a battle to defeat a fierce villain, named Malware, who has evil plans of destroying the world.

Omniverse also spawned a second video game, which was developed by High Voltage Software for the Wii U, Wii, PlayStation 3, and Xbox 360 and by 1st Playable Productions for the Nintendo 3DS. This game takes place during the events of Frogs of War, where Ben must fight the Incurseans to get back to Earth and stop Emperor Milleous, Attea, Dr. Psychobos, and the Way Bads.

References

External links

 

2012 American television series debuts
2014 American television series endings
2010s American animated television series
2010s American science fiction television series
Omniverse
English-language television shows
Cartoon Network Studios superheroes
American children's animated action television series
American children's animated adventure television series
American children's animated science fantasy television series
American children's animated superhero television series
Cartoon Network original programming
Teen animated television series
Teen superhero television series
Television series by Cartoon Network Studios
American sequel television series
Works by Len Wein
Anime-influenced Western animated television series
Television series about shapeshifting
Television series set on fictional planets